Season two of the 2016 edition of El Gran Show premiered on July 30, 2016.

On October 22, 2016, model & reality TV star Rosángela Espinoza and Lucas Piro were declared the winners, model, singer & actress Leslie Shaw and Oreykel Hidalgo finished second, while model & reality TV star Melissa Paredes and Sergio Álvarez finished third.

Cast

Couples 
On July 30, 2016, seven celebrities were presented in a special episode. The rest of celebrities were announced in the first week, being the former contestant Leslie Shaw, Erick Sabater and Rosángela Espinoza. It was also presented to the professional dancers, being Marianela Pereyra and Toño Tafur new to the show.

Host and judges 
Gisela Valcárcel and Aldo Díaz returned as hosts while Jaime "Choca" Mandros being replaced by Miguel Arce as co-host. Morella Petrozzi, Carlos Cacho, Michelle Alexander, Pachi Valle Riestra and the VIP Jury returned as judges.

Scoring charts 

Red numbers indicate the sentenced for each week
Green numbers indicate the best steps for each week
 the couple was eliminated that week
 the couple was safe in the duel
  the couple was eliminated that week and safe with a lifeguard
 the winning couple
 the runner-up couple
 the third-place couple

Average score chart 
This table only counts dances scored on a 40-point scale.

Highest and lowest scoring performances 
The best and worst performances in each dance according to the judges' 40-point scale are as follows:

Couples' highest and lowest scoring dances 
Scores are based upon a potential 40-point maximum.

Weekly scores 
Individual judges' scores in the charts below (given in parentheses) are listed in this order from left to right: Morella Petrozzi, Carlos Cacho, Michelle Alexander, Pachi Valle Riestra, VIP Jury.

Week 1: First Dances 
The couples danced cumbia, jazz, latin pop, merengue or salsa.
Running order

Week 2: Party Night 
The couples performed one unlearned dance and a danceathon of cumbia.
Running order

*The duel
Andrea & Ítalo: Safe
Darlene & Toño: Eliminated (but safe with the lifeguard)

Week 3: Characterization Night 
The couples performed one unlearned dance being characterized to popular music icons.
Running order

*The duel
Andrea e Ítalo: Safe
Santi & Michelle: Safe
Darlene & Toño: Eliminated

Week 4: Salsa Night 
The couples (except those sentenced) danced salsa.
Running order

*The duel
Erick & Marianela: Eliminated
Andrea & Ítalo: Safe
Cuto & Thati: Safe

Week 5: Switch-Up Night 
The couples (except those sentenced) performed a double dance with a different partner selected by the production.
Running order

*The duel
Santi & Michelle: Eliminated (but safe with the lifeguard)
Angie & Rodrigo: Safe

Week 6: Trio Dances Night 
The couples (except those sentenced) performed a trio dance involving another celebrity. In the versus, only two couples faced dancing acrobatic salsa, the winner would take two extra points plus the couples who gave their support votes.

Due to personal issues, Anselmo Pedraza withdrew from the competition, so Leslie Shaw danced with Emanuel Colombo since this week.
Running order

*The duel
Cuto & Thati: Safe
Andrea & Ítalo: Eliminated

Week 7: Crazy Hour Night 
The couples (except those sentenced) danced pachanga and a danceathon of cumbia.

Due to an injury, Lucas Piro was unable to perform, so Rosángela Espinoza danced with troupe member Jorge Válcarcel instead.
Running order

*The duel
Orlando & Mariale: Safe
Santi & Michelle: Eliminated

Week 8: Latin Night 
The couples (except those sentenced) performed one latin dance. In the versus, the couples faced dancing different dance styles.
Running order

*The duel
Cuto & Thati: Safe
Leslie & Emanuel: Eliminated (but safe with the lifeguard)

Week 9: Trio Cha-cha-cha Night 
The couples (except those sentenced) danced trio cha-cha-cha involving another celebrity and a team dance of cumbia. This week, none couples were sentenced.

Due to personal issues, Emanuel Colombo was unable to perform, so Leslie Shaw danced with troupe member Jorge Ávila instead.
Running order

*The duel
Orlando & Mariale: Eliminated
Angie & Rodrigo: Safe

Week 10: Quarterfinals 
The couples performed a conceptual dance and a dance improvisation which involved seven different dance styles, all being rehearsed during the week by the couples and only one being chosen by a draw in the live show.

Due to personal issues, Jorge Ávila withdrew from the competition, so Leslie Shaw danced with Oreykel Hidalgo since this week.
Running order

Week 11: Semifinals 
The couples performed the world dances and salsa. This week, none couples were sentenced.
Running order

*The duel
Cuto & Thati: Eliminated
Angie & Rodrigo: Safe

Week 12: Final 
On the first part, the couples danced freestyle and a trio dance involving another celebrity.

On the second part, the final three couples danced waltz.
Running order (Part 1)

Running order (Part 2)

Dance chart
The celebrities and professional partners will dance one of these routines for each corresponding week:
 Week 1: Cumbia, jazz, latin pop, merengue or salsa (First Dances)
 Week 2: One unlearned dance & the danceathon (Party Night)
 Week 3: One unlearned dance (Characterization Night)
 Week 4: Salsa (Salsa Night)
 Week 5: Double dance (Switch-Up Night)
 Week 6: Trio dances & the versus (Trio Dances Night)
 Week 7: Pachanga & the danceathon (Crazy Hour Night)
 Week 8: One unlearned dance & the versus (Latin Night)
 Week 9: Cha-cha-cha &  team dances (Trio Cha-cha-cha Night)
 Week 10: Conceptual dances & dance improvisation (Quarterfinals)
 Week 11: One unlearned dance & salsa (Semifinals)
 Week 12: Freestyle, trio dances & waltz (Finals)

 Highest scoring dance
 Lowest scoring dance
 Gained bonus points for winning
 Gained no bonus points for losing
 Danced, but not scored
In Italic indicate the dances performed in the duel

Guest judges 
Since the beginning of this season, a guest judge was present at each week to comment on and rate the dance routines. In the last week were present ten guest judges, who together with the main judges determined the winning couple.

Notes

References

External links

El Gran Show
2016 Peruvian television seasons
Reality television articles with incorrect naming style